Ernest Joseph Field Loveless (6 December 1907 – 21 Dec 1950) was an Australian rules footballer who played for St Kilda and Hawthorn in the VFL.

Loveless played in the back pocket and started his career with St Kilda.

Loveless was captain coach of the Wangaratta Football Club in the Ovens & Murray Football League in 1930. Loveless was captain-coach of the O&MFL team that lost to the Goulburn Valley Football League in 1930.

He crossed to Hawthorn in 1933 and was a best and fairest winner the following season. Loveless was vice captain of Hawthorn in 1935 and 1936, his last two years in the VFL.

References

External links

1930 - Wangaratta FC team photo

1907 births
St Kilda Football Club players
Hawthorn Football Club players
Peter Crimmins Medal winners
1950 deaths
Australian rules footballers from Melbourne
People from St Kilda, Victoria